Obongsan is a mountain of North Korea. It has an elevation of 1,289 metres. It stands between Yodok County and Sudong district in South Hamgyong Province.

See also
List of mountains of Korea

References

Mountains of North Korea